Mohamed Tawfiq Abou Habaga (21 May 1921 – 1 July 1987) was an Egyptian footballer who played as a midfielder. He competed in the 1948 Summer Olympics.

References

1921 births
1987 deaths
Footballers at the 1948 Summer Olympics
Egyptian footballers
Association football midfielders
Olympic footballers of Egypt
Footballers from Cairo
Mediterranean Games silver medalists for Egypt
Mediterranean Games medalists in football
Footballers at the 1951 Mediterranean Games